César Augusto Martínez (born 1944 in Laredo, Texas) is an artist, prominent in the Chicano world of art. While studying at what was then called Texas A&I College, and later Texas A&I University, he became involved in the Chicano movement for civil rights and became close friends with several of its leaders.

He is currently based in San Antonio, Texas.

Early life
He was raised by his mother and her family in Laredo as his father died when he was an infant. He graduated from Martin High School in Laredo, Texas.

Exhibitions
Martínez has exhibited his work at the Fresno Metropolitan Museum; Centro Cultural Aztlán in San Antonio, Texas; and the Yerbabuena Center for the Arts, San Francisco, among other venues.

Collections

Martínez' work is in the collection of the Smithsonian Institution, the Vero Beach Museum of Art and the McNay Art Museum, the Museo de Arte Moderno in Mexico City, The Cheech Marin Center for Chicano Art, Culture & Industry and others.

References

External links
 Lengthy but informative oral history interview with the Smithsonian Archive of American Art

1944 births
Living people
People from Laredo, Texas
Artists from Texas
20th-century American painters
American male painters
21st-century American painters
21st-century American male artists
20th-century American male artists